Navbahor District is a district of Navoiy Region in Uzbekistan. The capital lies at the village Beshrabot. The district consists of 5 urban-type settlements (Kalkonota, Saroy, Quyi Beshrabot, Keskanterak, Ijant) and 7 rural communities (incl. Beshrabot).

Navbahor origins from Persian word Now-Bahaar(New-Spring) which means early spring.

References

Navoiy Region
Districts of Uzbekistan